The WTA Argentine Open is a WTA-affiliated tennis tournament founded as the  Argentine Championships. It was initially played from 1929 to 1987 and restarted in 2021. It is held at the Buenos Aires Lawn Tennis Club in Buenos Aires, Argentina and played on outdoor clay courts.

The tournament made a return to the WTA 125 tournaments calendar in 2021. It was the first professional women's tennis tournament in Argentina since 1987. The tournament takes place in November on outdoor clay courts.

Past finals

Singles

Doubles

References

External links
 WTA Results Archive

 
Clay court tennis tournaments
Tennis tournaments in Argentina
Sports competitions in Buenos Aires
1929 establishments in Argentina
Recurring sporting events established in 1929
WTA Tour